Arianny Celeste (born Penelope López Márquez on November 12, 1985) is an American ring girl and model. She is a co-host on TV show Overhaulin' and has been in Playboy magazine.

Early life 
Celeste was born on November 12, 1985, in Las Vegas, Nevada. She is of Mexican and Filipino descent. "Arianny" is a nickname she was given as a child. She attended Eldorado High School and attended college at UNLV, where she majored in fitness management and nutrition.

Career

As ring girl 
Celeste made her UFC debut in 2006 at the Hard Rock Hotel and Casino in Paradise, Nevada.

She was voted "2006 Ring Girl of the Year" by Fighter's Only Magazine.

In 2008, at the first World MMA Awards, Celeste was voted "2008 Ring Girl of the Year".

In 2009, she won her second consecutive title at the 2nd World MMA Awards as Celeste become the "2009 Ring Girl of the Year".

In 2010, Celeste became the World MMA Awards "2010 Ring Girl of the Year", making it her third consecutive title.

At the 4th World MMA Awards in 2011, Celeste was voted the "2011 Ring Girl of the Year" again beating Brittney Palmer. This made it her 4th consecutive award.

In 2012, Celeste was nominated for the "2012 Ring Girl of the Year" award at the World MMA Awards. Celeste lost out to Brittney Palmer who became the first person other than Celeste to win the award.

Celeste was nominated again in 2013 as she looked to win the "Ring Girl of the Year" crown back from Palmer. Celeste further lost out to Palmer. This was Celeste's second consecutive loss.

In 2014, Celeste and Palmer were both nominated for the "2014 Ring Girl of the Year" at the World MMA Awards. Celeste regained her title as the "Ring Girl of the Year" making it her fifth time to have won the award and breaking a new record.

In 2015, former UFC bantamweight champion Ronda Rousey argued "Either the ring card girls are paid too much, or the fighters aren't paid enough." UFC ring girls are reputedly paid $18,000 a year. This excludes jobs outside the UFC, like modeling. Arianny Celeste protested, calling Rousey a "big bully". Celeste argued that being a ring girl is harder than it seems.

As model 
Celeste has modeled for magazines such as Maxim, FHM, Playboy, Sports Illustrated, and Fighter's Only Magazine.

On February 4, 2010, Sports Illustrated named her "Lady of The Day."

Maxim voted her "The Hottest UFC Octagon Girl" in the May 2010 issue where she was featured as the cover model. Arianny also appears in Maxim's Hot 100 list for 2010, 2011, 2012, 2013 and 2014; she placed #23, #69, #58, #18 and #59 respectively on the list.

Celeste posed nude for the November 2010 issue of Playboy, which was one of top-selling issues that year.

As host 
The UFC premiered a new weekly, web-only show called UFC Ultimate Insider on July 29, 2010. Celeste serves as host for the show, with Joe Rogan interviewing various UFC fighters. It also features updates on upcoming matches, PPV's, as well as highlights from previous events. The first episode featured a new photo shoot with Celeste.

Celeste was the co-host of TV series Overhaulin'. She appeared in seven episodes from 2014 to 2015.<ref>{{cite web|url=http://www.hollywoodreporter.com/news/velocitys-overhaulin-adds-arianny-celeste-608973|title=Velocity's 'Overhaulin Adds Arianny Celeste as Co-Host|website=The Hollywood Reporter|date=September 4, 2017|access-date=August 29, 2014}}</ref>

 Others Hooters invited Celeste to be a judge at the 2011 Hooters International Swimsuit Pageant. Celeste is featured as an Octagon girl in video games UFC Undisputed 2010, UFC Undisputed 3, EA Sports UFC and EA Sports UFC 2''.

Charity 
In September 2009, high school senior Conner Cordova, a fan of mixed martial arts, asked Celeste to attend his prom with him in a series of three YouTube videos. Celeste agreed, provided that he found a date for her friend. However, Celeste was unable to appear due to her schedule, so the plan changed to attending another dance. That also proved impossible, so Cordova and Celeste sponsored their own event, which doubled as a fundraiser for victims of the 2010 Haiti earthquake.

In 2013, Celeste, along with female mixed martial artists from various promotions, auctioned their sports bras on eBay to raise money for breast cancer research.

During the COVID-19 pandemic, she organized a GoFundMe fundraiser to provide medical Protective equipment for the Centennial Hospital in Las Vegas and other related hospitals.

Filmography

Television

Movies

Video games

References

External links 

 
 
 Arianny Celeste UFC Bio
 
 

1985 births
Living people
Female models from Nevada
American people of Mexican descent
Mixed martial arts people
People from the Las Vegas Valley
University of Nevada, Las Vegas alumni
American models of Filipino descent
21st-century American women